"L-O-V-E" is a song written by Bert Kaempfert and Milt Gabler, recorded by Nat King Cole for his 1965 studio album L-O-V-E.

Composition and background 
The song was composed by Bert Kaempfert with lyrics by Milt Gabler, and produced by Lee Gillette. The trumpet solo was performed by Bobby Bryant. The song had previously appeared as an instrumental track on Kaempfert's album Blue Midnight (1964).

For international versions of his  L-O-V-E album, Nat King Cole also recorded versions of "L-O-V-E" and other songs, in Japanese (mixed with English words), Italian, German, Spanish and French. In this last language, the song was renamed "Je Ne Repartirai Pas" and translated by Jean Delleme.

Joss Stone version 

English singer Joss Stone recorded a cover of "L-O-V-E" for the soundtrack to a commercial for Chanel's Coco Mademoiselle fragrance. The ad, starring Keira Knightley and directed by Joe Wright, debuted on September 24, 2007 on E!, Bravo, and VH1.

Stone's version was released digitally on September 18, 2007, reaching number 100 on the UK Singles Chart and number 75 on the Swiss Singles Chart. It was also later included as a bonus track on the deluxe version of her third studio album Introducing Joss Stone (2007), as well as on her compilation album The Best of Joss Stone 2003–2009 (2011).

Stone performed a duet of the song with Natalie Cole at Frosted Pink, a benefit concert to raise awareness of women's cancer, which took place at the Barker Hangar in Santa Monica, California, on October 6, 2007, and aired on ABC on October 14.

Yōko Oginome version

"L-O-V-E" was covered in Japanese by Yōko Oginome as her 41st single, released on October 24, 2011 by Victor Entertainment. Based on the 1965 version recorded by Hibari Misora, the song was used by TBS as the theme song of the drama series Love & Fight. The B-side is a cover of the 1944 song "Candy".

Track listing

In popular culture
It appears in the opening credits of the 1998 film The Parent Trap.

A version by Michael Feinstein is the theme song for season 1 of the TV series Why Women Kill.

Despite some people having the impression they heard a recording from Frank Sinatra of this song, the only instance he sang it was with Dean Martin as a guest appearance in a medley for the 1970s New Year's Eve on The Dean Martin Show, season 6, episode 15.

In the talent show scene of the 1994 adaptation of The Little Rascals, Blake McIver Ewing's Waldo performs this as a duet with Brittany Ashton Holmes' Darla.

Charts

Nat King Cole version

Joss Stone version

Certifications

References

External links
 

Yōko Oginome version
 
 

1964 singles
1964 songs
2001 singles
2007 singles
Capitol Records singles
Dionne Warwick songs
Joss Stone songs
Michael Bublé songs
Nat King Cole songs
Natalie Cole songs
Yōko Oginome songs
Song recordings produced by Raphael Saadiq
Songs with lyrics by Milt Gabler
Songs with music by Bert Kaempfert
Virgin Records singles
Japanese-language songs
Victor Entertainment singles

ja:LOVE (荻野目洋子の曲)